The Te Kāhui o Matariki Public Holiday Act 2022 is an Act of Parliament which makes Matariki a public holiday in New Zealand and establishes the exact dates of the holiday for the next 30 years. The Bill passed its third reading on 7 April 2022 and received royal assent on 11 April.

Background 
On 7 September 2020, Prime Minister Jacinda Ardern pledged to make Matariki a public holiday if the Labour Party were re-elected in the 2020 general election. The proposed public holiday would not be implemented until 2022, during which businesses could recover from the economic impacts of the COVID-19 pandemic in New Zealand. On 4 February 2021, Ardern announced the first date for the public holiday as 24 June 2022 and said that legislation to give this legal effect would be introduced during the 2021 parliamentary session.

On 2 July 2021, the day the constellation rose, Ardern announced the proposed dates for the next 30 years, determined by a Matariki Advisory Group drawn from iwi across the country. The date of the holiday was formalised, as the Friday closest to the 4 days of the nights of Tangaroa in the lunar month Piripi. The dates varied from late June to mid July, but were always on a Friday, to encourage people to travel and spend time with their families, and to give an extra public holiday to people who usually miss out on Mondayised public holidays (such as those who work Tuesday to Saturday). The date of Matariki varies so much because the 354-day Māori lunar calendar (with occasional intercalary months) only approximates the 365.25 day solar Gregorian solar calendar; Christian and Jewish moveable feasts vary for the same reason.

Legislation 
The act designates a public holiday to be observed annually – Matariki Observance Day:5 – becoming New Zealand's twelfth public holiday.

The act allows the governor-general, on the advice of a minister, to add a new date of celebration in a given year that has not already been designated a date.:6(1) The date must be on a Friday and in the calendar year following the last year that has been already allocated.:6(2) The decision to allocate a new date must be made at least four years prior to the last allocated date.:6(3)

A list of already-allocated dates is given in the bill for years 2022 to 2052. The first date the holiday is to be celebrated is 24 June 2022.

The bill is written in both English and Māori and is the fifth piece of legislation to do so.

Legislative history

Introduction
The bill was introduced to Parliament on 30 September 2021 by Associate Minister for Arts, Culture and Heritage Kiri Allan.

First reading 
The bill passed its first reading on 30 October 2021. It was supported by the Labour, Green and Māori parties, but opposed by National and ACT. National argued that Matariki should replace an existing public holiday instead of being added as a new holiday, to lessen the impact on businesses which is estimated to be NZ$448 million annually.

Second reading
The bill passed its second reading on 29 March 2022. During the debate, the National and ACT parties expressed concerns  about creating a 12th public holiday; claiming that it would cost NZ$450 million and have a negative impact on businesses. The Labour, Green and Māori parties argued that the bill would establish a new Māori public holiday in the calendar and raise awareness of Māori indigenous knowledge.

Third reading
The bill passed its third reading on 7 April 2022. It was supported by the Labour, Green, and Māori parties but was opposed by the National and ACT parties. During the final debate, National MP Paul Goldsmith argued that Matariki should replace a previous public holiday while ACT's Small Business spokesperson Chris Baillie claimed that having a new public holiday would cost businesses NZ$453 million. The Bill's sponsor Kiritapu Allan defended Matariki, arguing that public holidays reduced employee burnout and stress while boosting hospitality and tourism. National MP Simon O'Connor suggested naming the bill a "neutral" name such as Pleiades, which prompted Crown-Māori Relations Minister Kelvin Davis to claim that the former's remarks showed National's contempt for Māori culture.

The bill received royal assent and became law on 11 April.

Footnotes

References

External links 
 

2021 in New Zealand law
2022 in New Zealand law
Local government in New Zealand
Māori politics
Public holidays in New Zealand
Statutes of New Zealand